Ralf-Peter Hemmann (born 8 December 1958) is a retired German gymnast. He competed at the 1980 Summer Olympics in all artistic gymnastics events and won a silver medal with the East German team. Individually he finished fourth in the vault and horizontal bar. He won a team bronze medal at the world championships in 1978 and an individual gold in the vault in 1981.

References

External links

 

1958 births
Sportspeople from Dresden
Living people
German male artistic gymnasts
Olympic gymnasts of East Germany
Gymnasts at the 1980 Summer Olympics
Olympic silver medalists for East Germany
Olympic medalists in gymnastics
Recipients of the Patriotic Order of Merit
Medalists at the 1980 Summer Olympics
Medalists at the World Artistic Gymnastics Championships